Vernal G. Riffe Jr. (June 26, 1925 – July 31, 1997) was an American politician of the Democratic Party. Riffe served Ohio House of Representatives for 36 years and was the longest serving speaker of the Ohio House of Representatives in the history of that institution, holding that office for 20 years.

Life and political career
Riffe, a moderate Democrat, was a strong Speaker, even bringing Republican members of the House under his sway by threatening to fund the campaigns of their Democratic opponents for re-election.

Riffe, who hailed from the impoverished Appalachian Region of southeastern Ohio, fought hard to bring money for development to his corner of the state. Riffe's efforts resulted in the creation of Shawnee State University in Portsmouth, sometimes referred to as "Vern Riffe U." He also brought funding to southern Ohio for the building of a major highway, Ohio 32, disparaged as the "Highway to Nowhere," which starts in the countryside near Athens, Ohio, in the east and winds its way westward across Southern Ohio, finally ending in rural Clermont County east of Cincinnati.  At the time of its construction it traversed no major population centers, stopping short of both Cincinnati and Athens.  Today, it is referred to as the Appalachian Highway or the James A. Rhodes Appalachian Highway.

Riffe has been honored by several state agencies in Ohio. The Vernal Riffe Chair, a professorship in government at Ohio State University is named after him. Ohio State's Department of Biochemistry is housed in the Vernal G. Riffe Building. The Vern Riffe Center for Government and the Arts, located across High Street from the Ohio Statehouse in Downtown Columbus, provides office space for the Governor of Ohio, members of the Ohio House of Representatives and many state agencies. The Vern Riffe Center for the Arts in Portsmouth is located at Shawnee State University.

Riffe served as a member of the Ohio House for 36 years, from 1959 to 1995 and served as speaker from 1975 until 1994. Because of his power to raise funds, Riffe's departure from the political scene was a major financial blow to the Ohio Democratic Party.

Riffe's wife, Thelma L Riffe, is also deceased (August 4, 2010). Both are buried at Memorial Burial Park in Wheelersburg, Ohio.

Buildings named after 
The Vern Riffe Center for the Arts is located on the Campus of Shawnee State; the Vern Riffe School located in Portsmouth, Ohio, and Vern Riffe Center for Government and the Arts is located in Columbus, Ohio.

Autobiography
An autobiographical book, Whatever's Fair, co-written by Cliff Treyens, a former Columbus Dispatch writer, was published in the spring of 2007 and celebrated the life and career of Riffe.  A gathering of family, friends, and former political colleagues was held the day before Riffe's birthday at the Portsmouth Welcome Center to introduce the book.

References

External links
  Ohio Historical Society
  Shawnee State University
  Vern Riffe Center for the Arts
  Official Site of the Ohio Government

1925 births
1997 deaths
Speakers of the Ohio House of Representatives
Democratic Party members of the Ohio House of Representatives
Ohio State University faculty
People from Portsmouth, Ohio
Shawnee State University
20th-century American politicians
People from New Boston, Ohio